The Murwillumbah railway station is a heritage-listed former terminus railway station located on the Murwillumbah line in South Murwillumbah, in the Tweed Shire local government area of New South Wales, Australia. The former railway station is also known as the Murwillumbah Railway Station and yard group. The station opened on 24 December 1894 and closed on 16 May 2004 when the line from Casino was closed. The station was added to the New South Wales State Heritage Register on 2 April 1999.

History 
Beyond the station, the line continued for a few kilometres as a freight line to Condong. It served a sugar mill until 1972. Murwillumbah had a X200 shunter until the opening of a new motorail siding in August 1988 made it surplus.

Despite no longer being served by trains, the station remains open as a NSW TrainLink booking office. The station forecourt is served by NSW TrainLink coach services to Casino, Tweed Heads and Robina, and Premier Motor Service services to Brisbane, Lismore and Sydney. It is also currently used as the town's tourist information centre.

Description 
The complex comprises a type 12 station pre-cast concrete freight station, erected ; a goods shed being a side shed without awning with an end platform, erected in 1894. Other structures included a concrete/steel/brick platform face; a water tower with a round brick base with cast iron tank over, erected ; and a jib crane - T533, erected 1894.

Murwillumbah had one platform, with a passing loop and motorail siding at the northern end of the station. It was served by trains from Sydney including the North Coast Mail until 1973, when replaced by the Gold Coast Motorail which in February 1990 was replaced by a XPT service.

Heritage listing 
Murwillumbah is a good example of a station constructed in the 1920s from pre cast concrete, the predominant material of the period of which relatively little has survived. The building is a substantial structure which has maintained the form of the earlier building with the change of material. It forms part of a group that contains a very good goods shed example and a rare water tank on a round brick base, only three of these were built, all on the north coast line. The station building has had some recent additions of poor quality which detract from significance. The site is also significant because of its connection with the carrying of vehicles on the Motorail service (no longer operating) and the facilities connected with that activity.

The Murwillumbah railway station was listed on the New South Wales State Heritage Register on 2 April 1999 having satisfied the following criteria.

The place possesses uncommon, rare or endangered aspects of the cultural or natural history of New South Wales.

This item is assessed as historically rare. This item is assessed as scientifically rare. This item is assessed as arch. rare. This item is assessed as socially rare.

See also 

List of railway stations in New South Wales

References

Attribution

External links

Murwillumbah station details Transport for New South Wales

New South Wales State Heritage Register
Articles incorporating text from the New South Wales State Heritage Register
Disused regional railway stations in New South Wales
Railway stations in Australia opened in 1894
Railway stations closed in 2004
South Murwillumbah, New South Wales
Murwillumbah railway line
2004 disestablishments in Australia